Sanmenhai is a cave in the Leye-Fengshan geopark in Guangxi, China.  The cave is unique in that it features seven skylights that mimic the layout of the constellation Ursa Major (the Big Dipper).

Etymology
Sanmenhai translates into English as three doors accessible to the sea.  The cave is also known as Shuiyuandong, meaning cave that produces water.

Location and geology 
Sanmenhai is located in Poxin, a village in Fengshan County, Guangxi.  It is an outlet of the Poxin underground river, which formed during the Permian period.

Exploration
The seven skylights of the cave are designated Skylight I - Skylight VII.  Skylights I - IV extend westward from the entrance of the cave.  Sanmenhai is delimited by Skylight III, which divides the  underground river into southeast and northwest sections.  The southeast portion is accessible by tourists, and extends  from the outlet to Skylight III.

Only three of the seven skylights are accessible by boat on the underground river: Skylights I, II, and III.

Sanmenhai is a typical karst landform.
skylight in sanmenhai is also called karst window(tiankeng) by Chinese, it is sinkhole-like formation, but differ from sinkhole

Skylight I
Skylight I is the biggest among the seven skylights. It is roughly circular in shape, with walls that are covered in vegetation. There are four routes to Skylight I: the upper and lower reaches of the Poxin River; Gandong cave in east and south; and a water cave from underground. In 2009, a diving exploration found that there is no cave channel in underground.

Skylight II
Some plants grow horizontally on the wall of Skylight II.

Skylight III
Skylight III is 690 m from the outlet. In 2008, explorers found that there was an underwater cave connecting Skylight III with  Skylight IV.

Skylight IV

Gallery

References

Caves of Guangxi